Dolichoderus tuberifer is a species of ant in the genus Dolichoderus. Described by Emery in 1887, the species is endemic to Indonesia and Thailand.

References

Dolichoderus
Hymenoptera of Asia
Insects of Indonesia
Insects of Thailand
Insects described in 1887